The Depretis VI government of Italy held office from 30 March 1884 until 29 June 1885, a total of 310 days, or 1 year, 2 months and 30 days.

Government parties
The government was composed by the following parties:

Composition

References

Italian governments
1884 establishments in Italy